Elm River is a stream in the U.S. states of North Dakota and South Dakota.

Elm River was named for the groves of elm trees situated along its course.

See also
List of rivers of North Dakota
List of rivers of South Dakota

References

Rivers of Dickey County, North Dakota
Rivers of Brown County, South Dakota
Rivers of North Dakota
Rivers of South Dakota
Tributaries of the Red River of the North